The 2021 IIHF Women's World Championship Division II was scheduled to be two international ice hockey tournaments organised by the International Ice Hockey Federation. The Division II Group A tournament would have been held in Jaca, Spain, from 10 to 16 April 2021 and the Division II Group B tournament in Zagreb, Croatia, from 7 to 13 March 2021.

In 2020, Australia was initially promoted but after Division II Group A was cancelled due to the COVID-19 pandemic, they remain in Division II Group B.

On 18 November 2020, both tournaments were cancelled due to the COVID-19 pandemic.

Division II Group A

Participants

Standings

Division II Group B

Participants

Standings

References

External links
Official website of IIHF

2021
Division II
2021 IIHF Women's World Championship Division II
2021 IIHF Women's World Championship Division II
Sports competitions in Zagreb
2021 in Spanish sport
2021 in Croatian sport
2021 in Spanish women's sport
2021 in Croatian women's sport
March 2020 sports events in Europe
April 2020 sports events in Europe
IIHF Women's World Championship Division II, 2021